Razin (also Romanized as Razīn; also known as Arazīn, Arzīn, and Barāzīn) is a village in Minjavan-e Gharbi Rural District, Minjavan District, Khoda Afarin County, East Azerbaijan Province, Iran. At the 2006 census, its population was 50, in 9 families.

References 

Populated places in Khoda Afarin County